Howick is a former New Zealand parliamentary electorate, which existed for one parliamentary term from 1993 to 1996, and was held by Trevor Rogers. In 1995, Rogers defected from National to the Right of Centre party.

Population centres
Based on the 1991 New Zealand census, an electoral redistribution was carried out. This resulted in the abolition of nine electorates, and the creation of eleven new electorates. Through an amendment in the Electoral Act in 1965, the number of electorates in the South Island was fixed at 25, so the new electorates increased the number of the North Island electorates by two. In the South Island, one electorate was abolished and one electorate was recreated. In the North Island, five electorates were newly created (including Howick), five electorates were recreated, and eight electorates were abolished.

This suburban electorate was in the southern part of greater Auckland.

History
The electorate was established in the 1993 election, and included the eastern part of the previous Otara electorate. The Otara electorate was usually won by Labour, but in the 1990 election when Labour lost a number of electorates, Trevor Rogers of National beat Taito Phillip Field the new Labour candidate for Otara to replace Colin Moyle (who was retiring). In the 1993 election, Trevor Rogers moved east to the new Howick electorate, which covered higher-income suburbs traditionally National. In 1995, Rogers defected to the Right of Centre party.

The Howick electorate was abolished in the 1996 election, the first mixed-member (MMP) election, when it was absorbed into the Manukau East electorate.

Members of Parliament
Key

Election results

1993 election

References

Historical electorates of New Zealand
Politics of the Auckland Region
1993 establishments in New Zealand
1996 disestablishments in New Zealand